Navarathri is a 1964 Indian Tamil-language drama film written, produced and directed by A. P. Nagarajan. The film stars Sivaji Ganesan and Savithri. It was the 100th film of Ganesan and is well known for his nine distinct roles. It was remade in Telugu in 1966 as Navaratri and in Hindi in 1974 as Naya Din Nai Raat. The film become a blockbuster at the box-office, running for over 100 days in all over Tamilnadu.

Plot 
The film opens with the narrator explaining that there are nine types of human behaviours (Navarasam) known as Wonder (அற்புதம்), Fear (பயம்), Compassion (கருணை), Anger (கோபம்), Equanimity (சாந்தம்), Disgust (அருவருப்பு), Elegance (சிங்காரம்), Bravery (வீரம்) and Brightness (ஆனந்தம்) and that Sivaji Ganesan's nine roles represents one character per role. The story traces Nalina's (Savitri) experience of these nine emotions on nine consecutive nights.

Nalina (Savitri) is the only daughter of a rich man. When she happily celebrates Navaratri festival at her home with her friends, her father informs about the visit of a  groom and his parents for her wedding. Nalina is reluctant to the proposal as she wants to marry her college mate Anand. After arguments with her father, she leaves home without her father's knowledge at the first Navaratri night.

First Night (Wonder): She searches for her lover in the college hostel, but finds that he has gone to get married. Nalina feels cheated by Anand and attempts suicide, where she is stopped by a widower, Arputharaj (Sivaji Ganesan). He takes her to his house and introduces her to his daughter. He urges her to tell her address to drop her safely. Unwilling to return home, she leaves the place the next early morning.

Second Night (Fear): The next day she damages the vegetables of a vendor. When the vendor fights with her, she is rescued by a homely looking woman. The woman takes Nalina to her home. Nalina meets several women in her house. But the house is a brothel house. She is trapped to a drunkard, (Sivaji Ganesan). The drunkard justifies it, that he cannot seduce his own wife as she is a TB patient. Though he does not want to betray his wife, he is not able to resist his feelings. Nalina advises and warns him in order to escape from him, but he does not want to hear it. After much struggle, the drunkard falls onto the floor and faints. Nalina escapes from the place.

Third Night (Compassion): After escaping from the brothel house, Nalina is caught by a patrol policeman for wandering into the road at unusual time. At the police station, she pretends to be a mentally ill woman. The police admit her at a mental hospital. The old aged lonely doctor Karunaagaran (Sivaji Ganesan) understands that Nalina is fine, but pretends to escape from cops and so he helps her. She stays in the hospital the whole night. The Doctor finds a newspaper with the photograph of hers the next morning. But Nalina escapes, while the doctor is still looking at the newspaper.

Fourth Night (Anger): Nalina misunderstands that the police jeep is coming for her. She dashes with a man with a gun (Sivaji Ganesan) and faints. The man takes her to his place. Nalina understands that the police are not looking for her, but looking for the man as he is a killer who killed a rich businessman as a revenge for his brother's death. The gunman insists that Nalina leave. But she doesn't as she feels he is a good person and convinces him to surrender to police. In an attack, the gunman is killed by the businessman's henchmen. Nalina escapes from the place.

Fifth Night (Equanimity): Fed up with life, Nalina runs onto a track to attempt suicide. An innocent villager (Sivaji Ganesan), looks at her and rushes to the track to save her and succeeds. He takes her to his house and introduces her to his elder sister. A local priest (Nagesh) visits their home and tells them that Nalina is possessed by a spirit in order to cheat them of money by performing some fake rituals. Nalina gets irritated by their acts and escapes away that night.

Sixth Night (Disgust): Nalina meets an old aged leper (Sivaji Ganesan), who once upon a time was a rich man. The man lost all his money in the treatment and charity (hoping that will help him from disease). He is disgusted by everyone, including his own son, who abandoned him when his money ran out. Nalina helps him by taking him to a hospital. The doctor is surprised as he is one who benefited by a medicine degree by the charity of the rich man. The doctor decides to stay with him until he is cured. Nalina leaves the hospital.

Seventh Night (Elegance): Nalina feels very tired and asks for water from one of the houses. People offer water to her. One of the men  "Sathyavaan Singaaram" (Sivaji Ganesan), is a director and actor of stage plays and road side plays. They have been committed for nine stage plays in the village on the account of the Navaratri celebration. But the heroine falls sick and his whole troop are in critical position, in search of a replacement for the seventh day play, failing on which will make them to lose their money and reputation in the village. He asks  Nalina to help by acting with him for the day's play. Nalina agrees on a condition that she should be let go after the play is over. The play is successful that night. The agent tries to misbehave with Nalina and the actor pulls him off and warns him. But he finds Nalina has left.

Eight Night (Bravery): Nalina disguises as a man and visits a house of a hunter Veerapan (Sivaji Ganesan). The hunter has been there for hunting a man-eater and for another purpose. Nalina introduces herself as Nathan, a secret agent in search of a criminal. The hunter seems to believe her and gives her an earnest welcome, feast and hospitality. Nalina finds that the hunter is a commissioner of police stayed in search of a criminal, which faked by Nalina. She tries to escape from the place, but she is caught by the hunter.

The hunter introduces himself as the paternal uncle of the groom whom her father proposed for her and the groom is none other than her lover – Anand. Nalina has left her home before her father knew that she is in love with a person and the lover is the same man he has arranged for his daughter. Also Nalina misunderstands that Anand  is going to marry another girl, but she is the girl. Nalina leaves for the Anand's place the ninth day.

Ninth Day (Bliss): Anand (Sivaji Ganesan), looks pale and dull after Nalina left her home. He is neither interested in living normally, nor in continuing with his studies. His parents are worried and scold him for wasting his life for a girl after all. Angered by this, he shuts himself into a room. Nalina reaches his home that time. Anand's parents and Nalina fear that he is attempting suicide. But suddenly the room opens and Nalina runs inside.

Anand wanted to surprise Nalina about their marriage and that is why he did not inform her about the engagement. Due to miscommunication, Nalina had left home on the first Navatri night and has come back on the ninth Navaratri night.

Anand and Nalina happily marry. Except the dead gunman, her marriage is attended by all the people she met during those eight days.

Cast

Main Cast 
Sivaji Ganesan in nine roles as:
 The Bridegroom "Anand" (Bliss)
 The Widower "Arputharaj" (Wonder)
 The Drunkard (Fear)
 The Doctor "Karunakaran" (Compassion)
 The Gunman (Anger)
 The Villager (Equanimity)
 The Leper (Disgust)
 The Actor "Sathyavan Singaram" (Elegance)
 The Hunter/The Commissioner of police "Veerappan" (Bravery)
Savithri as Nalina
Nagesh as Village Poosari
Manorama as Mentally ill woman (Nalina's Friend)
Kutty Padmini as Lalitha (Arputharaj's Daughter)

Supporting cast 

Male cast
K. Sarangapani as Manickam Pillai (Nalina's Father)
V. K. Ramasamy as Sundaram (Anand's Father)
E. R. Sahadevan
P. D. Sambandam as (Drama stage Music Player)
V. Gopalakrishnan as (Doctor)
Karikol raj
Karuppu Subbiah
S. V. Rajagopal
Gundu Karupaiah
Gemini Balu
M. Karupaiah

Male cast (Contd.)
Krishnamoorthy
Balu
Chandranbabu
S. R. Gopal
Balasundaram
Pasupathy
Ramanathan
Ganesan
Gundumani
Shanmugam
Ratnam Brothers

Female cast
T. P. Muthulakshmi as Mental Hospital Patient
C. K. Saraswathi as Mental Hospital Patient
C. T. Rajakantham as Mental Hospital Patient
Kumari Rukmani as Visalakshi (Anand's Mother)
Thilakam Rajakumari
M. S. S. Bhagyam
Radhabai as Villager
Devaki
Spider Sundari
S R Sivakami as Nalina's friend
Seethalakshmi
Kamakshi

Production 
Navarathri is Sivaji Ganesan's 100th film as an actor. At the time of release, it held the record for the most number of characters played by a single actor in an Indian film. Cinematography was handled by W. R. Subba Rao, art direction by Ch. E. Prasad Rao and editing by Rajan.

Soundtrack 
The music was composed by K. V. Mahadevan and the lyrics were penned by Sankaradas Swamigal and Kannadasan. The song "Iravinil Aattam" was remixed by G. V. Prakash Kumar in Kadavul Irukaan Kumaru (2016).

Reception 
The Indian Express wrote on 14 November 1964, "Director APN, with deft, imaginative touches that alternate with crudity and mere melodrama makes what might have been an outstanding picture just a good entertainer". Writing for Kalki, P. Kannan said the film could be watched multiple times of the performances of Ganesan and Savitri.

Legacy 
Following Sivaji's death in 2001, BBC News named Navarathri as one of his best films. Malathi Rangarajan of The Hindu wrote in 2007, " At a time when playing even three roles in a film was a wonder, you saw an actor handling nine with élan! And each was so different from the other that you almost forgot it was the same man playing all the parts".

References

External links 

1960s Tamil-language films
1964 films
Films directed by A. P. Nagarajan
Films scored by K. V. Mahadevan
Films with screenplays by A. P. Nagarajan
Indian drama films
Tamil films remade in other languages